Richard Hodgson (24 December 1892 – 13 September 1968) was a British water polo player. He competed at the 1924 Summer Olympics and the 1928 Summer Olympics.

References

External links
 

1892 births
1968 deaths
British male water polo players
Olympic water polo players of Great Britain
Water polo players at the 1924 Summer Olympics
Water polo players at the 1928 Summer Olympics
Place of birth missing